Pseudonocardia saturnea is a bacterium from the genus of Pseudonocardia which has been isolated from air.

References

Pseudonocardia
Bacteria described in 1960